Erik van Rooyen (born 21 February 1990) is a South African professional golfer currently playing on the European Tour and the PGA Tour. He won the 2019 Scandinavian Invitation on the European Tour, and the 2021 Barracuda Championship on the PGA Tour.

Amateur career
Van Rooyen attended the University of Minnesota from 2009, turning professional in 2013.

Professional career
Van Rooyen has played on the Sunshine Tour since turning professional. In early 2017, he had his first win on the tour, the Eye of Africa PGA Championship, making a birdie at the first extra hole in a three-man playoff. He played on the 2017 Challenge Tour where he had his second professional win, the Hainan Open. A number of other good finishes, including fourth place in the Kazakhstan Open and a tie for third in the season-ending NBO Golf Classic Grand Final, put van Rooyen third in the Challenge Tour Race to Oman rankings, earning a card for the 2018 European Tour season.

In December 2017, van Rooyen was runner-up in the Joburg Open, three strokes behind Shubhankar Sharma. The event was part of the Open Qualifying Series and his high finish gave him an entry to the 2018 Open Championship, his first major championship. He led the 2018 Dubai Duty Free Irish Open by four strokes after three rounds, but a final round 74 dropped him into a tie for 4th place.

Van Rooyen made a good start to 2019, finishing joint runner-up in the Commercial Bank Qatar Masters and the Hassan II Golf Trophy. He also had a top-10 finish in the 2019 PGA Championship.

On 25 August 2019, van Rooyen won his first European Tour title at the Scandinavian Invitation at Hills Golf & Sports Club, outside Gothenburg, Sweden. He sank a 12 feet birdie putt on the finishing par 5 72nd hole, to win by a stroke with a new tournament record 261 on the par 70 course.

After van Rooyen tied for third at the WGC-Mexico Championship in February 2020, he advanced to a career best 40th on the Official World Golf Ranking.

After a T20 finish at the 2020 WGC-FedEx St. Jude Invitational in August 2020, van Rooyen was granted Special Temporary Membership until the end of the 2019–20 PGA Tour season.

In August 2021, van Rooyen won his first PGA Tour event at the Barracuda Championship. He broke the tournament scoring record by shooting a total of 50 points (modified stableford) over four rounds.

Amateur wins
2011 Southern Cape Open
2012 Minnesota State Amateur

Professional wins (4)

PGA Tour wins (1)

European Tour wins (1) 

European Tour playoff record (0–1)

Sunshine Tour wins (1)

Sunshine Tour playoff record (1–0)

Challenge Tour wins (1)

1Co-sanctioned by the China Tour

Results in major championships
Results not in chronological order before 2019 and in 2020.

CUT = missed the half-way cut
WD = withdrew
"T" indicates a tie for a place
NT = No tournament due to COVID-19 pandemic

Summary

Most consecutive cuts made – 6 (2018 Open – 2020 U.S. Open)
Longest streak of top-10s – 1 (2019 PGA)

Results in The Players Championship

"T" indicates a tie for a place

Results in World Golf Championships

1Cancelled due to COVID-19 pandemic

NT = No tournament
"T" = Tied
QF, R16, R32, R64 = Round in which player lost in match play
Note that the Championship and Invitational were discontinued from 2022.

Team appearances
Professional
World Cup (representing South Africa): 2018

See also
2017 Challenge Tour graduates

References

External links

South African male golfers
Minnesota Golden Gophers men's golfers
Sunshine Tour golfers
European Tour golfers
Sportspeople from the Western Cape
People from Bellville, South Africa
White South African people
1990 births
Living people